Lan is a personal name, frequently used in Chinese and Vietnamese contexts as a feminine given name, which means "orchid."

In Vietnamese, "Lân" with the accent denotes a masculine given name, which refers to Kỳ Lân, a mythical creature that appears only to protect the noble. See qilin.

Lan may refer to:

East Asian name order
Bian Lan (born 1984), Chinese basketball player
Hương Lan (born 1956), Vietnamese singer
Jiang Lan (born 1989), Chinese sprinter 
Law Lan (born 1934), Hong Kong actress
Li Lan (born 1961), Chinese handball player 
Lu Lan (born 1987), Chinese badminton player
Lu Mong Lan (born 1927), Vietnamese general
 Ngọc Lan (1956-2001), Vietnamese singer
Sang Lan (born 1981), Chinese gymnast
Wang Lan (1922–2003), Taiwanese writer
Yang Lan (born 1968), Chinese businesswoman and talk show host
Zhang Lan (1872–1955), Chinese political activist 
Zhao Lan (born 1963), Chinese chess player

Western name order
Lan Bale (born 1969), South African tennis player
Lan Cao (born 1961), Vietnamese-born American novelist
Lan Medina, Filipino comic book artist 
Lan Roberts (1936–2005), American radio presenter
Lan Samantha Chang (born 1965), American writer 
Lan Wright (born 1923), British writer

Fiction
Lan Asuka, fictional character in the Devil Lady manga series
Lan Di, fictional character in the video games Shenmue and Shenmue II
Lan Hikari, fictional character in the MegaMan Battle Network series of video games
Lan Mandragoran, fictional character in the Wheel of Time series of novels by Robert Jordan
Gabriel Lan, fictional character in the Marvel comics universe
Lan Fan, a minor supporting character in the Fullmetal Alchemist manga
Lan Kellyan, a fictional character in the book Monarch, the Big Bear of Tallac by Ernest Thompson Seton
Tso Lan, a fictional character in the animated series Jackie Chan Adventures

See also
 Lan (surname 蓝), a Chinese surname
 Lan (surname 兰), a different Chinese surname

Feminine given names
Chinese given names
Vietnamese names